Bridelieae is a tribe of the family Phyllanthaceae.

Subtribes and genera
It comprises 5 subtribes: 
Amanoinae
Amanoa
Keayodendrinae
Keayodendron

Pseudolachnostylidinae
Bridelia (also Candelabria, Gentilia, Pentameria, Tzellemtinia)
Cleistanthus (also Clistanthus, Godefroya, Kaluhaburunghos, Lebidiera, Lebidieropsis, Leiopyxis, Nanopetalum, Neogoetzia, Paracleisthus, Schistostigma, Stenonia, Stenoniella, Zenkerodendron)
Pentabrachion
Pseudolachnostylis

Saviinae
Croizatia
Discocarpus
Gonatogyne
Savia
Tacarcuna

Securineginae
Securinega
Lachnostylis

See also
 Taxonomy of the Phyllanthaceae

References

Phyllanthaceae
Malpighiales tribes